Roman Zhmurko (born 27 July 1997) is a professional Ukrainian football goalkeeper who plays for Hirnyk-Sport.

Career
Zhmurko is a product of UFK-Karpaty Lviv youth sportive systems.

He spent his career in the Ukrainian Premier League Reserves club FC Volyn Lutsk. And in December 2016 Zhmurko was promoted to the main-squad team of the FC Volyn in the Ukrainian Premier League, but he made his debut for Volyn Lutsk in the Ukrainian Premier League only in a match against FC Dnipro on 31 May 2017.

On 19 February 2018 he signed contract with the Ukrainian Second League club Nyva Ternopil. In 2019, Zhmurko joined Swedish 3rd Division club Anderstorps IF. He returned to Ukraine in 2020, joining FC Kalush, before later moving to Hirnyk-Sport at the end of August 2020.

References

External links 
 Profile on FFU site 
 

1997 births
Living people
Ukrainian footballers
Ukrainian expatriate footballers
Association football goalkeepers
Ukrainian Premier League players
FC Volyn Lutsk players
FC Nyva Ternopil players
Anderstorps IF players
FC Kalush players
FC Hirnyk-Sport Horishni Plavni players
Ukrainian expatriate sportspeople in Sweden
Expatriate footballers in Sweden